Rocchette is a village in Tuscany, central Italy, administratively a frazione of the comune of Castiglione della Pescaia, province of Grosseto.

Geography 
Rocchette is about 25 km from Grosseto and 6 km from Castiglione della Pescaia, and it is situated at the foot of Poggio Peroni, one of the peaks of the promontory of Punta Ala, in the pine forest of Roccamare along the Tyrrhenian coast. Rocchette is known for its beaches and it is populated especially in summer,  by tourists, mainly from Northern Europe. The village is situated west to the Provincial Road which links Castiglione della Pescaia to Follonica.

History 
Rocchette was formerly known as Campo Albo, a small village born in the Middle Ages, with a castle and a notable pieve, that no longer exists.

Main sights 
 Fort of Rocchette (12th century), it was built as a watchtower in the Middle Ages and later known as Rocca di Campo Albo. It was restructured by the Medici in the 16th century.
 Chapel of Madonna del Carmine (18th century), it's the chapel of the castle of Rocchette. It was built to replace the lost pieve di Rocca (12th century).
 Tower of Cala Galera (13th century), it was built as a watchtower by the Republic of Pisa and then restructured by the Medici in 1568.

References

Bibliography 
  Emanuele Repetti, «Rocchette», Dizionario Geografico Fisico Storico della Toscana, 1833–1846.
 Bruno Santi, Guida storico-artistica alla Maremma. Itinerari culturali nella provincia di Grosseto, Siena, Nuova Immagine, 1995, pp. 78–81.

See also 
 Buriano
 Pian d'Alma
 Pian di Rocca
 Punta Ala
 Roccamare
 Tirli
 Vetulonia

Frazioni of Castiglione della Pescaia